Ugo Cantelli (30 March 1903 – 23 April 1972) was an Italian sports shooter. He competed in the 50 m rifle, prone event at the 1932 Summer Olympics.

References

External links
 

1903 births
1972 deaths
Sportspeople from the Metropolitan City of Bologna
Italian male sport shooters
Olympic shooters of Italy
Shooters at the 1932 Summer Olympics